Illian Walker, better known as Ils or iLS, is an English musician and producer, who has released records on labels including Marine Parade and Distinct'ive Records.

Born in London, Ils started his production career on LTJ Bukem's drum and bass label, Good Looking Records. He was signed to Marine Parade by owner Adam Freeland, who cited Ils' unique breaks production. Ils is influenced by electro, funk, and techno artists in his Idiots Behind the Wheel album. His Soul Trader album represented a more even sound, with few particularly energetic or downbeat tracks. He also mixed an album for Distinct'ive Records' Y4k series.

His 2002 single, "Next Level", on Marine Parade spent one week at #75 in the UK Singles Chart, in February 2002. It was released on his second studio album, Soul Trader, as "6 Space (Next Level)".

Discography

Albums

Studio albums

Compilation albums

Singles

References

External links
 Official website archive
 Official Myspace
 
 
 
 Ils Interview - September 2007

DJs from London
English electronic musicians
English record producers
Living people
Electronic dance music DJs
Date of birth missing (living people)
Year of birth missing (living people)